Someday You'll Return is a psychological horror video game developed by Czech company CBE Software. The game follows the protagonist Daniel in the search for his daughter in Moravian forests. The game features Czech realities, such as tourist signs, the Czech landscape and natural monuments. It is dubbed in English with the possibility of Czech or English subtitles. 

In March 2023, the game was released in an enhanced version Someday You'll Return: Director's Cut on the PS4 and PS5 game consoles, the update is free for game owners on PC, subtitles have also been added for Spanish, French, Portuguese, German, Italian, Japanese and Chinese language.

Gameplay
Someday You'll Return is a psychological horror video game played from a first-person perspective. There is no combat in the game, but there are many game mechanics player must use to progress. In some parts of the game there are stealth sequences in which player must sneak around to avoid the danger. Players' decisions and actions have consequences which can influence the ending, it is possible to reach five different endings. The player must orient himself according to the Czech trail blazing, has a cell phone with GPS tracking, and is required to use crafting, herbalism and environment interaction to advance in the game.

Development
The game was developed for five years, uses the Unreal Engine and was released for the Microsoft Windows platform. The game was first announced in 2015 with by trailer on YouTube. The atmosphere bears a resemblance to the horror Blair Witch Project. According to the developers the game was inspired by Silent Hill 2, Outlast 2, The Vanishing of Ethan Carter and Resident Evil 7: Biohazard. In 2018 the game received Unreal Dev Grant by Epic Games. The game was a commercial failure, which was partly attributed to piracy, as the beta version of the game was leaked prior its release by one of journalists who received the build for preview. It was estimated by developers that 98% of players played illegal copies. It was released for Windows on 5 May 2020, having been delayed from its original 14 April release date due to the COVID-19 pandemic.

Plot
Daniel's daughter Stela has left home and Daniel sets up to track her. She ran to the Chřiby forests where Daniel spent some time before but swore to never come back. The environment is based on the Cyril and Methodius Trail near Uherské Hradiště, but the area is composed of other samples of places from Moravia, for example: Hradisko of St. Clement, Gorazd's Well, Kozel Rock, Cimburk Castle and Moravian Karst, two places are also from Bohemia: the Cemetery in Hřensko and Pravčická brána.

Reception
Someday You'll Return was presented at the Croatian Reboot Develop 2018, and the game has won awards in categories the Visual Excellence and Game of the Year. It also received nominations in categories Best Gameplay and Special Selection. At the Moscow White Nights conference, it won award in the Best Art category. It was evaluated by the Czech servers Doupě.cz 70%, Games.cz 70%, BonusWeb.cz 75% and INDIAN 80%.

The game has received mixed to positive reviews from critics. It holds 66% at Metacritic based on 31 reviews indicating mixed or average reviews.

References

External links

2020 video games
Adventure games
Psychological horror games
Exploration video games
Video games developed in the Czech Republic
Video games set in the Czech Republic
Windows games
Xbox One games
PlayStation 4 games
Unreal Engine games
Video games postponed due to the COVID-19 pandemic
Video games with alternate endings
Single-player video games
Video games set in forests